The men's open category competition in judo at the 1976 Summer Olympics in Montreal was held on 31 July at the Olympic Velodrome. The gold medal was won by Haruki Uemura of Japan.

Results

Main brackets

Pool A

Pool B

Repechages

Repechage A

Repechage B

Finals

Final classification

References

Judo at the 1976 Summer Olympics
Judo at the Summer Olympics Men's Openweight